There are 21 counties in the state of New Jersey. The New Jersey Superior Court subsumed and replaced the New Jersey County Courts, which were abolished in 1978. The Superior Court has 15 vicinages (jurisdictional districts or circuits), some encompassing two or three counties, each of which has its own courthouse or courthouses. Frequently the county courthouse is home to the appropriate vicinage of the Superior Court. Some counties have different facilities for different divisions, such as the criminal, civil, family, and finance courts. In some counties there are other buildings which house court facilities where proceedings take place, some of which are historic county courthouse or administration buildings, which may also serve as offices for county, state or federal agencies.

Many court buildings have been evaluated by the state historic preservation office (SHPO) and have been listed on the New Jersey Register of Historic Places (NJRHP) and the National Register of Historic Places (NRHP), either individually or as contributing properties (CP) to historic districts. Several have been documented by the Historic American Buildings Survey (HABS). Three courthouses (at Salem, Sussex, and Burlington) dating from the 18th century that are among the oldest courthouses in the United States still in active use.

The Richard J. Hughes Justice Complex in Trenton, the state capital, is home the administrative headquarters of the statewide court system of the Judiciary of New Jersey, including the New Jersey Supreme Court and the Appellate Division of the New Jersey Superior Court.

The below lists include buildings in active use as well as extant historic buildings that have served county courthouses.

Courthouses

Historic buildings, annexes, additional and alternative courthouses

See also

List of counties in New Jersey
Courts of New Jersey
Judiciary of New Jersey
List of United States federal courthouses in New Jersey
List of the oldest courthouses in the United States
List of courthouses in the United States
Vicinage Clause

Sources

References

External links
Wiktionary: Vicinage

 
New Jersey
Courthouses, county